The Clinical Neuropsychologist is a peer-reviewed medical journal covering clinical neuropsychology. It was founded in 1987 as Clinical Neuropsychologist, obtaining its current name in 1995. It is published eight times per year by Routledge on behalf of the American Academy of Clinical Neuropsychology, of which it is the official journal. The editor-in-chief is Yana Suchy (University of Utah). According to the Journal Citation Reports, the journal has a 2017 impact factor of 1.807.

References

External links

Publications established in 1987
Routledge academic journals
English-language journals
Clinical psychology journals
Neuropsychology journals
Academic journals associated with learned and professional societies of the United States
8 times per year journals